Canary Mission is a website established in 2014 that compiles dossiers on student activists, professors, and organizations, focusing primarily on those at North American universities, which it considers be anti-Israel or antisemitic and has said that it will send the names of listed students to prospective employers. Canary Mission listings have been used by the Israeli government and border security officials to interrogate and deny entry to pro-Boycott, Divestment and Sanctions (BDS) US citizens, and by potential employers.

Individuals listed by Canary have said it is a blacklist designed to intimidate students, faculty members, and community activists engaged in Palestine solidarity work. Some pro-Israel activists consider the site's tactics to be overly aggressive, while others applaud its efforts against pro-Palestinian activists.

The operators of the website have maintained their anonymity, justifying their secrecy by saying that "many of our detractors just want to know who we are so they can physically harm us."

Activity 
According to their website, Canary Mission "documents individuals and organizations that promote hatred of the US, Israel and Jews on North American college campuses". The profiles on the website are constructed using publicly visible information pulled from social media sites. The profiles are often quite detailed and have included personal information, such as child photos of individuals. The website has thousands of profiles of students and professors who its editors believe have engaged in pro-Palestinian or anti-Israel activism, and it has been described as a blacklist. It also includes a handful of profiles for prominent white supremacists. Canary Mission hosts some apology essays written by people whose profiles were listed on the site; in return, their profiles are removed from the website's list.

Timeline 
In December 2017, Canary Mission reported on what it alleged antisemitic tweets posted by students associated with Solidarity for Palestinian Human Rights (SPHR) at McMaster University. The tweets were written between 2011 and 2017, and contained support for Hitler as well as calls for death of Israel and Zionists. SPHR in response said it "condemns all forms of anti-Semitism within our organization", and that the referenced comments were "intolerable in every sense". The university actively reviewed the "disturbing social media post", but did not publish the results of its review since "it is not our practice to provide details of any actions taken or sanctions applied with regard to individual students".

In April 2018, during a Boycott, Divestment and Sanctions (BDS) campaign at George Washington University, flyers with Canary Mission's logo were posted around the university denouncing a planned student senate vote. On the day of the vote, two adult men wearing canary costumes performed a dance in the lobby of the building where the vote was taking place. In September 2018, Canary Mission released a report on the vote, highlighting reputed antisemitic and anti-Israel tactics used to promote the vote.

In May 2018, Canary Mission released a report on social media posts by Students for Justice in Palestine chapter members at Florida State University, saying that 36% of the social media posts by SJP members were "endorsements or promotion of terror as well as calls for intifada and violence against Jews". The FSU SJP chapter subsequently released a statement writing that they "entirely condemn and denounce the racist, anti-Black, and anti-Semitic statements made by some of the individuals who were previous students and members of our SJP chapter," however commenting that some of the social media posts were "legitimate criticisms of Israeli governmental policies and practices, even though they are presented as anti-Semitic." According to Canary Mission, FSU SJP's response did not condemn social media posts that "called for intifada and violence against Jews."

Use of Canary Mission listings 
The Israeli security services have reportedly used content from Canary Mission to screen profiled individuals at Ben Gurion Airport. They also have reportedly used claims made on the website to justify decisions to deport people from Israel.

Profiles hosted on Canary Mission may harm the employment opportunities of those listed, particularly students and untenured faculty, by making available their statements to potential employers in a readily available online profile. According to W.J.T. Mitchell, who has a Canary Mission profile, prospective employers see Canary Mission profiles appear at the top of Google search results for students and recent alumni who do not have a "very deep set of achievements".

Structure 
Canary Mission does not publish any information about who runs or funds the website. Although Canary Mission's website claims that it is a nonprofit organization, no organization with the name Canary Mission is registered with the IRS. Though Canary Mission's website does provide a way to donate to the organization via debit or credit card, there is no public record of Canary Mission's sponsors and/or donors. Multiple pro-Israel organizations have denied having any affiliation with Canary Mission.

According to Edwin Black, extreme antisemitic comments as well as outright threats of violence have been directed towards Canary Mission. Following the threats, Canary Mission became even more cautious and avoided disclosing its physical location or identity. According to Canary Mission's blog, "many of our detractors just want to know who we are so they can physically harm us," which, according to Black, has caused Canary Mission to restrict its communications with journalists. Black, who says he was able to verify Canary Mission's location and operations, says they are a group of students and ex-students working in a medium-sized office in an American city.

Funding
In October 2018, The Forward and Haaretz reported that Canary Mission received funding from the Hellen Diller Family Foundation, a supporting foundation of the Jewish Community Federation of San Francisco (JCFSF), and that the organization's operations were headed by Jonathan Bash through an Israeli charity named Megamot Shalom. Soon after the exposure, JCFSF announced that they would cease funding Canary Mission. The Forward also identified the Jewish Community Foundation of Los Angeles as a major donor to Megamot Shalom, having donated a sum of $250,000 in 2016–2017.

The Lobby – USA, an undercover investigation by Al Jazeera into Israel's covert influence campaign in the United States, reported that Adam Milstein was the major funding source for Canary Mission.

Controversy and criticism 
The filmmaker Rebecca Pierce described Canary Mission as using "'McCarthyist tactics' and employing 'open racism'." Writers for Le Monde Diplomatique and Jewish academics have compared Canary Mission's practice of extorting apologies from targeted individuals in exchange for amnesty to that of authoritarian regimes and McCarthyism in the United States.

The Forward reported that while some of the profiles include content that is "genuinely troubling", such as antisemitic social media posts, other accusations made by the website are misleading. One such profile accused a student of "demonizing Israel" because the student had made an announcement at a Hillel-sponsored dinner critical of Donald Trump's decision to move the United States embassy to Jerusalem. According to Israeli attorney Emily Schaeffer Omer-Man, Canary Mission's information is "often neither reliable, nor complete, nor up to date". She said that the site should not be used by Israeli border officials as it does not meet the reliability standards mandated by Israeli law.

Pro-Palestinian sources have denounced Canary Mission's activities as an attempt to silence critics of Israel on American college campuses through intimidation. In response, pro-Palestinian activists have started a website called "Against Canary Mission", and say they intend to host profiles of people targeted by Canary Mission in order to portray their activism in a positive light. 

Some pro-Israel organizations have also criticized Canary Mission for its aggressive tactics. Jewish and pro-Israeli students have said that pro-Palestinian students and faculty have suspected them of colluding with Canary Mission, blaming them even when they were not involved with Canary. The Israel on Campus Coalition has endorsed Canary Mission, writing that "through online platforms such as Canary Mission, a database devoted to exposing hatred of Jews and Israel, the pro-Israel community has established a strong deterrent against anti-Semitism and BDS activism".

In February 2018, Twitter briefly suspended Canary Mission's account, for exposing a 2017 tweet by a pro-Palestinian activist that "modified Adele's lyrics to say "Set Fire to the Jews". According to Twitter, they made an error in blocking Canary.

In October 2019, Ray Hanania commented about the Canary Mission:"Imagine the outrage that would be expressed if there was a website that maintained a public list of Jews, publishing their photos and personal information simply because they were active supporters of Israel. Well, you would have to imagine it because it doesn't exist. But you don't have to imagine a website that shows the photos and personal information of Arab Americans who support Palestinian rights and is filled with vicious accusations of them being "anti-Semitic" and even "anti-American."

References

External links 
 Canary Mission website
 Against Canary Mission website

Academic scandals
American political websites
Anti-Palestinian sentiment
Israeli–Palestinian conflict
Organizations established in 2014
Cyberbullying